Advent Lutheran Church is a church affiliated with the Evangelical Lutheran Church in America located in the Upper West Side, Manhattan, New York City. The church building was designed by the architectural firm of William Appleton Potter (1842–1909).

Description
The church is a double-height brick and stone structure over a basement. It has  a pitched slate roof, and is notable in having all of its stained glass in the nave and clerestory designed by Louis Comfort Tiffany and manufactured by his Tiffany Studios, which was also responsible for the ceramic mosaic behind the altar, the sanctuary lamps, the pews, and the painted decorative organ frontal pipes in the front of the sanctuary. The nave and clerestory windows, which feature St. Paul preaching at Athens and Christ returning in glory with angels, breaking swords beneath them and ushering in a reign of peace.

Tiffany windows restoration campaign
The Tiffany windows restoration campaign, titled "Shining God's Light - the Tiffany Windows Project", has been ongoing since 2007, raising funds for a one-million-dollar complete restoration of all the Tiffany windows.

Social programs
Advent Lutheran runs two large food assistance programs:  a monthly food pantry on the first Saturday of each month and a monthly Community Lunch program on the fourth Saturday of each month.  Both are free and open to anyone in need.

References 

Dunlap, David W. From Abyssinian to Zion: A Guide to Manhattan's Houses of Worship. (New York: Columbia University Press, 2004.) p. 207.

External links
 Official Website

Lutheran churches in New York City
Upper West Side
Churches in Manhattan
Churches completed in 1900
19th-century Lutheran churches in the United States
Gothic Revival church buildings in New York City
William Appleton Potter church buildings